The Little Fox, known in Hungary as Vuk, is a 1981 Hungarian animated film produced by Pannónia Filmstúdió, based on the novel Vuk by István Fekete. The film is directed by Attila Dargay and written by Attila Dargay, István Imre and Ede Tarbay, and released in December of 1981.

A computer animated and widely panned sequel, A Fox's Tale, was released in 2008.

Plot
The film tells the story of a little fox kit, Vic (Vuk in the original Hungarian version), who ventures away from his family's den and, upon his return finds it empty. He concludes that his whole family left the den with the human hunter (called "Smoothskinner" in the cartoon) because he can smell him. His uncle Karak finds him, decides to keep Vic in this comforting thought instead of telling him the truth, then offers for Vic to stay with him, and Karak continues to raise him.

As Vic grows older, he develops much cunning and cleverness. Now a young adult fox, he even dares to infiltrate the hunter's house, during which he finds a vixen, named Foxy, held captive in a cage. During a stormy night, he tricks the guard dogs and other animals, as well as the hunter himself, and eventually helps the vixen escape by smashing the cage open with a loaded wagon.

Foxy joins Vic and Karak in the woods, but when Autumn comes, Vic's uncle is shot by the hunter during the seasonal hunt. Vic swears revenge on the hunter and finally accomplishes it: first by breaking into the food locker and eating up all the eggs, then taking away all the poultry from the cages while playing many jokes on the hunter's stupid dogs (which results in the two dogs becoming strays at the end). Eventually, the hunter decides to set up bear traps around his house, luring Vic with goose roast; however, the two hunting dogs fall into said traps, and the third one seriously injures the hunter himself as well. At the end of the film, Vic and Foxy have cubs of their own.

Production
Originally produced as a TV series, Dargay visited the Budapest Zoo to study the movements and habits of newborn fox cubs.

Voice cast
 József Gyabronka - 
 Judit Pogány - Young 
 Teri Földi - 
 Gyula Szabó - 
 László Csákányi - 
 Erzsébet Kútvölgyi - Fox girl
 Tibor Bitskey - Narrator
 Róbert Koltai	-  the Hunter

English version
The English-language dub of the film, titled simply The Little Fox, was made in 1987 and released in the United States on home video by Celebrity Home Entertainment. The English dub changes Vuk's name to "Vic" and his wife's name to "Foxy," although Karak's name remains unchanged.

Voice cast
 Steven R. Weber - Adult Vic
 Corinne Orr - Vic
 John Bellucci - Vic's Father, Narrator
 Anne Costello - Vic's mother, Additional Voices
 William Kiehl - 
 Les Marshak - Additional Voices
 Lucy Martin - Foxy
 Peter Newman - Additional Voices
 George Gonneau - Chester the Hunter
 Maia Danziger - Additional Voices
 Ira Lewis - Additional Voices

Reception and legacy
Video Choice gave the film a positive review, calling it a "charming and visually appealing film" while author Giannalberto Bendazzi (Animation: A World History) called it "an excellent example of personality animation".

A digital restoration was completed in 2021 under the supervision of the film's cinematographer. It remains the most-popular Hungarian animated feature of all time. The director said that putting Vuk on screen was one of his dearest cartoon works.

Home media
The film was released on VHS in 1987 by Celebrity Home Entertainment (re-released 4 November 1994).

See also

 The Fox and the Hound - a similar 1981 animated film about a fox.
 List of animated feature films of 1981
 List of Hungarian films
 Pannonia Film Studio

References

External links

 
 
The Little Fox on MUBI
 The Little Fox on Rotten Tomatoes

1981 animated films
1981 films
1980s children's fantasy films
Animated films about foxes
Children's comedy-drama films
Films directed by Attila Dargay
Hungarian animated films
Hungarian children's films
Hungarian comedy films
Hungarian drama films
Hungarian fantasy films
Films based on Hungarian novels
1980s children's animated films
Alternative versions of films